Stenham is a surname. Notable people with the surname include: 

Cob Stenham (1932–2006), British businessman
Polly Stenham (born 1986), English playwright